Satya Mithya is a 1989 Bangladeshi film directed by A. J. Mintu. It won five Bangladesh National Film Awards in the Best Producer, Best Screenplay, Best Dialogue, Best Editing and Best Child Artist categories.

Cast
 Shabana as Rabeya
 Alamgir as Raju Ahmed
 Anwar Hossain as Gofur
 Wasimul Bari Rajib as Amjad
 Golam Mustafa as Mr. Chowdhury
 Nuton as Rita Chowdhry

References

External links

1989 films
Bengali-language Bangladeshi films
1980s Bengali-language films
Films whose writer won the Best Screenplay National Film Award (Bangladesh)
Films directed by A J Mintu